Doddaharve  is a village in the southern state of Karnataka, India. It is located 8 km from Bylakuppe.

Demographics
 India census, Doddaharve had a population of 5064 with 4221 males and 843 females.

See also
 Mysore
 Districts of Karnataka

References

External links

Villages in Mysore district